Autophagy related 12 is a protein that in humans is encoded by the ATG12 gene.

Autophagy is a process of bulk protein degradation in which cytoplasmic components, including organelles, are enclosed in double-membrane structures called autophagosomes and delivered to lysosomes or vacuoles for degradation. ATG12 is the human homolog of a yeast protein involved in autophagy (Mizushima et al., 1998).[supplied by OMIM]

Autophagy requires the covalent attachment of the protein Atg12 to ATG5 through a ubiquitin-like conjugation system. The Atg12-Atg5 conjugate then promotes the conjugation of ATG8 to the lipid phosphatidylethanolamine.

Atg12 was found to be involved in apoptosis. This protein promotes apoptosis through an interaction with anti-apoptotic members of the Bcl-2 family.

References

External links

Further reading